Broad Street Station may refer to:
Broad Street railway station (England), a former station in London, England
Newark Broad Street Station, a station in Newark, New Jersey, United States
The former name of Military Park (NLR station), renamed when the system was extended to the above station
Broad Street station (BMT Nassau Street Line), a station in the New York City Subway system
Broad Street Station (Philadelphia), a former station in Philadelphia, Pennsylvania, United States
Broad Street Station (Richmond), a former station in Richmond, Virginia, United States